The Selibüel is a mountain of the Bernese Alpine foothills, located in the municipality of Rüschegg in the canton of Bern. It is the culminating point of the wooded range that lies north of the Gurnigel Pass, between the valleys of the Sense (west) and the Aare (east). The summit area, as well as the other summits of the range, such as the Pfyffe, is easily accessible by car or by bus via the Gurnigel road.

References

External links
Selibüel on Hikr

Mountains of the Alps
Mountains of the canton of Bern
Mountains of Switzerland
One-thousanders of Switzerland